César Bocachica (born 28 July 1938) is a Puerto Rican former basketball player who competed in the 1960 Summer Olympics.

Bocachica is from Ponce, Puerto Rico. He is an engineer by training.  On 12 December 2013, Bocachica was honored with a ceremony and added to the list of illustrious Ponce citizens at the Park of the Illustrious Ponce Citizens in Ponce's Tricentennial Park.

References

1938 births
Living people
Puerto Rican men's basketball players
Olympic basketball players of Puerto Rico
Basketball players at the 1960 Summer Olympics
Basketball players at the 1963 Pan American Games
Basketball players at the 1967 Pan American Games
Sportspeople from Ponce, Puerto Rico
Pan American Games medalists in basketball
Pan American Games bronze medalists for Puerto Rico
Point guards
Medalists at the 1963 Pan American Games